The West Bank Super Cup  is the football super cup competition in the West Bank of Palestine, played between the winners of the West Bank Premier League and the West Bank Cup.

Results

See also
Palestine Cup
Gaza Strip Super Cup

References

External links
RSSSF.com

National association football supercups
Football competitions in the State of Palestine